Leucotelia is a monotypic moth genus of the family Erebidae erected by George Hampson in 1926. Its only species, Leucotelia ochreoplagata, was first described by George Hamilton Kenrick in 1917. It is found on Madagascar.

This species has a wingspan of 33 mm.

References

Hampson, G. F. (1926). Descriptions of New Genera and Species of Lepidoptera Phalaenae of the Subfamily Noctuinae (Noctuidae) in the British Museum (Natural History).

Moths described in 1917
Calpinae
Moths of Madagascar
Monotypic moth genera